SMS V44 was a  Large Torpedo Boat (Großes Torpedoboot) of the Imperial German Navy, that served during the First World War. V44 was built by AG Vulcan at their Stettin shipyard from 1914–1915, entering service on 22 July that year. V44 took part in the Battle of Jutland in 1916, and also operated in the English Channel and the Baltic. She survived the war, and was interned at Scapa Flow, surviving the Scuttling of the German fleet at Scapa Flow. She was used as a target by the British at Portsmouth, and later scrapped in-situ in 1922, although remnants of the ship remain in Portsmouth Harbour.

Construction

V44 was the second ship in the second batch of six V25-class torpedo boats (V43–V48) ordered from AG Vulcan for the Imperial German Navy on 22 April 1914, as part of the 1914 shipbuilding programme. She was launched as Yard number 359 on 24 February 1915 and completed on 20 July 1915.
 

Armament originally consisted of three 8.8 cm SK L/45 naval guns in single mounts, together with six 50 cm (19.7 in) torpedo tubes with two fixed single tubes forward and 2 twin mounts aft. Up to 24 mines could be carried. The ship had a complement of 87 officers and men.

Service
On 24 April 1916, the German battlecruisers of I Scouting Group and the light cruisers of the II Scouting Group set out from Kiel on a mission to bombard the British East-coast towns of Yarmouth and Lowestoft, with the torpedo boats of the 6th and 9th Torpedo Boat Flotillas as escorts, and V44 as part of the 6th Flotilla. The battleships of the High Seas Fleet were deployed in support, with the hope of destroying isolated elements of the British Forces if they tried to intercept. There was a brief engagement between the German forces and the light cruisers and destroyers of the Harwich Force, which caused the German battlecruisers to break off the bombardment of Lowestoft, but rather than take the change to destroyer the outnumbered British force, the Germans chose to retire.

V44 took part at the Battle of Jutland on 31 May–1 June 1916, as leader of the 11th Half Flotilla of the 6th Torpedo Boat Flotilla, and again in support of the German Battlecruisers. In total, seven torpedoes were launched, two from V44, none of which hit their targets. Later during the day, these four torpedo boats, together with the cruiser  and several other torpedo boats, engaged British destroyers supporting the 3rd Battlecruiser Squadron. The British destroyer  was badly damaged during this engagement. From about 20:15 CET (19:15 GMT), V44 took part in a large-scale torpedo attack on the British fleet in order to cover the outnumber German battleship's turn to west. V44 launched three torpedoes, which as with all the torpedoes launched in this attack, missed. V44 was part of the 7th Torpedo Boat Flotilla during the inconclusive Action of 19 August 1916, when the German High Seas Fleet sailed to cover a sortie of the battlecruisers of the 1st Scouting Group.

On 22 January 1917, 11 torpedo boats of the 6th Torpedo Boat Flotilla, including V44, left Helgoland to reinforce the German torpedo forces in Flanders. The British Admiralty knew about this transfer due to codebreaking by Room 40, and ordered the Harwich Force of cruisers and destroyers to intercept the German torpedo boats. he British set six light cruisers, two flotilla leaders and sixteen destroyers to intercept the eleven German ships, deploying them in several groups to make sure that all possible routes were covered. During the night of 22–23 January, the 6th Flotilla encountered three British light cruisers (and ). The 6th Flotilla carried out unsuccessful sorties into the Channel on 25 January and against a convoy between Britain and the Netherlands on 29 January before the Flanders forces were further reinforced on 18 February.

On the night of 25/26 February, the Germans launched another major raid on the Channel. Six torpedo boats of the 6th Flotilla, including V44, were to attack the Dover Barrage, while five more torpedo boats were to attack shipping in the vicinity of the Downs, and three more operating against the shipping routes between Britain and the Netherlands. The torpedo boats of the 6th Flotilla encountered the British destroyer  and attacked with heavy gunfire and torpedoes (one of which hit the British destroyer but failed to explode), but Laverock only received light damage, and the 6th Flotilla turned back for Zeebrugge, with the drifters of the Dover Barrage unharmed. The attack on the Downs found no shipping and ended up in a brief shore bombardment that killed three civilians. V44 did not take part in the Flanders-based forces attack on the Channel on March 17/18, but on the night of 22/23 March took part in a raid on the shipping route between Britain and the Netherlands during which the Dutch cargo ship  was sunk. On 29 March 1917, the 6th Flotilla returned to Germany.

In October 1917, Germany launched Operation Albion, an invasion of islands in the West Estonian archipelago to secure the left flank of the German Army following the German capture of Riga. The Germans assembled a powerful naval force to support the operation, reinforced by forces detached from the High Seas Fleet, including the 6th Torpedo Boat Flotilla and V44. V44 returned to the North Sea in November 1917, and on 17 November 1917 took part in the Second Battle of Heligoland Bight as part of the 12th Half flotilla.

Fate
After the end of hostilities, V44 was interned at Scapa Flow in accordance with the terms of the Armistice of 11 November 1918. On 21 June 1919, the German fleet interned at Scapa scuttled itself, but British forces managed to beach several of the ships before they could sink, including V44, which was beached on the south side of Fara. The Treaty of Versailles allocated a battleship, a cruiser and three torpedo boats to Britain as "Propaganda ships", which could be used for a short period of time for experimental purposes or as targets. V44 was one of these ships. On 8 December 1920, V44 was used as a target by the monitor  in order to test the effectiveness of new weapons and shells. V44 was hit by four 6-inch (152 mm), two 4.7-inch (120 mm) and eight 4-inch (102 mm) shells, which caused heavy flooding, and V44 was towed to Portsmouth harbour and beached (near the torpedo boat , used as a target by Terror on 13 October that year) to avoid sinking. V44 was sold for scrap to TW Ward on 30 March 1921, but they took little action to break up the ship, and V44 (along with V82) was sold again, to the shipbreaking yard Pounds, in 1927. The two ships were partly broken up in-situ during the late 1920s and early 1930s, with the remains of the ships left in the mud banks. The remnants of the two ships remain visible at low tide in 2019.

Notes

References

Sources

 
 
 

 

Torpedo boats of the Imperial German Navy
1915 ships
Ships built in Stettin
World War I torpedo boats of Germany